is a railway station in Chikusa-ku, Nagoya, Aichi Prefecture, Japan.

This station provides access to the Higashiyama campus of Nagoya University, which is the station's namesake, and the Nagoya campus of Nanzan University.

Lines

 (Station number: M18)

Layout

Platforms

References

External links
 

Chikusa-ku, Nagoya
Railway stations in Japan opened in 2003